Ma Zhong may refer to:

Ma Zhong (馬忠), Chinese military officer who captured Guan Yu in an ambush during Lü Meng's invasion of Jing Province
Ma Zhong (Shu Han), Chinese general of the Shu Han state in the Three Kingdoms period